Alison Tyler (born 1969) is the pseudonym of an American author, editor and publisher of erotica living in Northern California. She has authored over 20 explicit novels, hundreds of short stories and has edited more than 60 erotic anthologies. She runs her own publishing company, Pretty Things Press ("Pretty on the outside, dirty on the inside").
Tired of getting mixed up with the porn actress with the same name, she now blogs on Patreon as Alison Trollop.

Career
Tyler began writing professionally in the 1990s, selling stories to Penthouse Variations and Playgirl. Her first novel was published by Blue Moon when she was 23. Tyler went on to write twelve novels for Masquerade Books before moving to Virgin Books' Black Lace and Cheek imprints in 1999.

Her short story fiction appears in a range of anthologies, including titles edited by Violet Blue, Stephen Elliott, Maxim Jakubowski, Rachel Kramer Bussel, Tristan Taormino, Zane and Tyler herself. She has edited numerous erotic anthologies for Cleis Press and  Pretty Things Press, the small publishing company Tyler runs.

Tyler writes in an intimate, semi-autobiographical style, focusing on themes of female submission, spanking, bondage, bisexuality and group sex. In August 2006, Tyler began blogging intensely about a former BDSM relationship, described by The Guardian as "a sulphurous personal memoir of past sexual activities which put Belle de Jour's timid exploits in the shade." Initially intending to write confessionally each day for a month, Tyler continued with her story for 16 months, gaining a broad and loyal daily readership.

Described as a "trollop with a laptop" by East Bay Express, Tyler continues to blog regularly, using the platform to engage with readers, and to promote emerging writers by showcasing their work in competitive "Smut Marathons". In 2013, the first in a trilogy of novels based on Tyler's diaries and personal blog entries is published. Billed by the publisher, Cleis Press as a "work of autobiographical fiction, a meta-novel with reality at the core", Dark Secret Love: A Story of Submission takes its title from the William Blake poem, The Sick Rose.

Tyler's work has been translated into several languages and her short story fiction appears in her collections Blue Sky Sideways, Bad Girl and Exposed. Her non-fiction includes Never Have the Same Sex Twice: a Guide for Couples and Never Say Never (forthcoming).

Tyler is an upbeat supporter of non-mainstream sexualities, erotic fiction and pornography, asserting, "People try to make you feel bad by saying, 'You write porn.' But I won't feel bad for it."

Select bibliography

Novels
 The Blue Rose, Rosebud Books, 1995, 
 Dark Room, Masquerade Books, 1995, 
 Dial L for Loveless, Masquerade Books, 1996,
 Venus Online, Masquerade Books,  1997, 
 The Silver Key: Madame Victoria’s Finishing School, Masquerade Books, 1998, 
 Learning to Love It, Black Lace, 2000, 
 Strictly Confidential, Black Lace,  2001, 
 Blue Valentine, Magic Carpet Books, 2002, 
 The ESP Affair, Magic Carpet Books, 2002, 
 Sweet Thing, Black Lace, 2002, 
 Sticky Fingers, Black Lace, 2003, 
 Something About Workmen, Black Lace, 2003, 
 Rumours, Cheek, 2005, 
 Tiffany Twisted, Cheek, 2006, 
 With or Without You, Cheek, 2006, 
 Melt With You, Cheek, 2008, 
 Dark Secret Love: a Story of Submission, Cleis Press, 2013,

Collections
 Blue Sky Sideways, Masquerade Books, 1996, 
 Bad Girl, Pretty Things Press, 2002, 
 Exposed: The Erotic Fiction of Alison Tyler, Cleis Press, 2006,

As editor
 Naughty Stories from A to Z, Pretty Things Press, 2002, 
 Down and Dirty: 69 Super Sexy Short-Shorts, Pretty Things Press, 2003, 
 Hers: 30 Erotic Tales Written Just for Her, (co-edited with Thomas S Roche), Pretty Things Press, 2003, 
 His: 30 Erotic Tales Written Just for Him, (co-edited with Thomas S Roche), Pretty Things Press, 2003, 
 Best Bondage Erotica, Cleis Press, 2003, 
 Naked Erotica, Pretty Things Press, 2004, 
 Luscious: Stories of Anal Eroticism, Cleis Press, 2006, 
 Slave to Love: Sexy Tales of Erotic Restraint,  Cleis Press, 2006, 
 Caught Looking (co-edited with Rachel Kramer Bussel), Cleis Press, 2006, 
 Got a Minute?: Sixty Second Erotica, Cleis Press, 2007, 
 Love at First Sting: Sexy Tales of Erotic Restraint, Cleis Press, 2007, 
 A Is for Amour, Cleis Press, 2007, 
 B Is for Bondage, Cleis Press, 2007, 
 F Is for Fetish, Cleis Press, 2007, 
 H Is for Hardcore, Cleis Press, 2007,
 J is for Jealousy, Cleis Press, 2008, 
 K Is for Kinky, Cleis Press, 2008, 
 Open For Business: Tales of Office Sex, Cleis Press, 2008, 
 Frenzy: 60 Stories of Sudden Sex, Cleis Press, 2008, 
 Never Have The Same Sex Twice, Cleis Press, 2008, 
 Hurts So Good: Unrestrained Erotica, Cleis Press, 2008, 
 Afternoon Delight: Erotica for Couples, Cleis Press, 2008, 
 Playing with Fire: Taboo Erotica, Cleis Press, 2009, 
 Pleasure Bound: True Bondage Stories, Cleis Press, 2009, 
 Got a Minute?: Sixty Second Erotica, reissue, Cleis Press, 2010, 
 Hide and Seek: Erotic Tales of Voyeurs and Exhibitionists, reissue, (co-edited by Rachel Kramer Bussel), Cleis Press, 2010, 
 Smart Ass, Bad Ass, Kiss My Ass: The Trilogy, Pretty Things Press, 2012, 
 The Big Book of Bondage, Cleis Press, 2013,

References

Living people
1972 births
American erotica writers
BDSM writers